Fodder, also called provender, is any agricultural foodstuff used specifically to feed domesticated livestock, such as cattle, rabbits, sheep, horses, chickens and pigs. "Fodder" refers particularly to food given to the animals (including plants cut and carried to them), rather than that which they forage for themselves (called forage). Fodder includes hay, straw, silage, compressed and pelleted feeds, oils and mixed rations, and sprouted grains and legumes (such as bean sprouts, fresh malt, or spent malt). Most animal feed is from plants, but some manufacturers add ingredients to processed feeds that are of animal origin.

The worldwide animal feed trade produced  tons of feed (compound feed equivalent) in 2011, fast approaching 1 billion tonnes according to the International Feed Industry Federation, with an annual growth rate of about 2%. The use of agricultural land to grow feed rather than human food can be controversial (see food vs. feed); some types of feed, such as corn (maize), can also serve as human food; those that cannot, such as grassland grass, may be grown on land that can be used for crops consumed by humans. In many cases the production of grass for cattle fodder is a valuable intercrop between crops for human consumption, because it builds the organic matter in the soil. When evaluating if this soil organic matter increase mitigates climate change, both permanency of the added organic matter as well as emissions produced during use of the fodder product have to be taken into account. Some agricultural byproducts fed to animals may be considered unsavory by humans.

Common plants specifically grown for fodder

 Alfalfa (lucerne)
 Barley
 Common duckweed
 Birdsfoot trefoil
 Brassica spp.
 Kale
 Rapeseed (canola)
 Rutabaga (swede)
 Turnip
 Clover
 Alsike clover
 Red clover
 Subterranean clover
 White clover
 Grass
 Bermuda grass
 Brome
 False oat grass
 Fescue
 Heath grass
 Meadow grasses (from naturally mixed grassland swards)
 Orchard grass
 Ryegrass
 Timothy-grass
 Corn (maize)
 Millet
 Oats
 Sorghum
 Soybeans
 Trees (pollard tree shoots for "tree-hay")
 Wheat

Types

 Biochar for cattle
 Bran
 Conserved forage plants: hay and silage
 Compound feed and premixes, often called pellets, nuts or (cattle) cake
 Crop residues: stover, copra, straw, chaff, sugar beet waste
 Fish meal
 Freshly cut grass and other forage plants
 Grass or lawn clipping waste
 Green maize 
 Green sorghum 
 Horse gram 
 Leaves from certain species of trees
 Meat and bone meal (now illegal in cattle and sheep feeds in many areas due to risk of BSE)
 Molasses
 Native green grass 
 Oilseed press cake (cottonseed, safflower, sunflower, soybean, peanut or groundnut)
 Oligosaccharides
 Processed insects (i.e. processed maggots)
 Seaweed (including Asparagopsis taxiformis which is used mainly as a supplement to reduce methane emissions by up to 90%)
 Seeds and grains, either whole or prepared by crushing, milling, etc.
 Single cell protein(can also be made from atmospheric )
 Sprouted grains and legumes
 Yeast extract (brewer's yeast residue)

Health concerns
In the past, bovine spongiform encephalopathy (BSE, or "mad cow disease") spread through the inclusion of ruminant meat and bone meal in cattle feed due to prion contamination. This practice is now banned in most countries where it has occurred. Some animals have a lower tolerance for spoiled or moldy fodder than others, and certain types of molds, toxins, or poisonous weeds inadvertently mixed into a feed source may cause economic losses due to sickness or death of the animals.  The US Department of Health and Human Services regulates drugs of the Veterinary Feed Directive type that can be present within commercial livestock feed.

Droughts 

Increasing intensities and frequencies of drought events put rangeland agriculture under pressure in semi-arid and arid geographic areas. Innovative emergency fodder production concepts have been reported, such as bush-based animal fodder production in Namibia. During extended dry periods, some farmers have used woody biomass fibre from encroacher bush as their primary source of cattle feed, adding locally-available supplements for nutrients as well as to improve palatability.

Production of sprouted grains as fodder

Fodder in the form of sprouted cereal grains such as barley, and legumes can be grown in small and large quantities.

Systems have been developed recently that allow for many tons of sprouts to be produced each day, year round. Sprouted grains can significantly increase the nutritional value of the grain compared with feeding the ungerminated grain to stock. In addition, they use less water than traditional forage, making them ideal for drought conditions. Sprouted barley and other cereal grains can be grown hydroponically in a carefully-controlled environment.

Although products such as barley are grain, when sprouted they are approved by the American Grassfed Association to be used as livestock feed.

See also

 Cannon fodder (metaphorical usage)
 Circular agriculture
 Factory farming
 Feed manufacturing
 Food-feed system
 Pasture

References

Further reading
 Zhou, Yiqin. Compar[ison of] Fresh or Ensiled Fodders (e.g., Grass, Legume, Corn) on the Production of Greenhouse Gases Following Enteric Fermentation in Beef Cattle. Rouyn-Noranda, Qué.: Université du Québec en Abitibi-Témiscamingue, 2011. N.B.: Research report.
Karl Heinrich Ritthausen (1872) Die Eiweisskörper der Getreidearten, Hülsenfrüchte und Ölsamen. Beiträge zur Physiologie der Samen der Kulturgewachese, der Nahrungs- und Futtermitel, Bonn, 1872 from Google books.

External links 

UK Food Standards Agency, Animal feed legislation and guidance 
FAO Feed Safety guidelines

 
Animal feed